Jason Oswell (born 7 October 1992) is an English professional footballer who plays for A.F.C. Telford United as a striker.

Following successful loan spells with Market Drayton Town and Nantwich Town, he turned professional at Crewe Alexandra in summer 2011. He spent the first half of the 2011–12 season on loan at Rhyl, before he was allowed to move on to Inverness Caledonian Thistle in June 2012. He failed to establish himself in the first-team and left the club in January 2013, ending the 2012–13 season at non-league sides Nantwich Town and Witton Albion. He spent four months in Australia with APIA Leichhardt Tigers from May 2013, where he won the Waratah Cup. He then returned to Wales and signed with Rhyl, though ended the 2013–14 season with Welsh Premier League runners-up Airbus UK Broughton. He joined Newtown in June 2014, and went on to enjoy a highly successful three seasons with the club, being named as Welsh Premier League Player of the Season in 2016–17 after scoring 22 goals in 31 league games. He also played on the losing side in the 2015 Welsh Cup final and was twice named in the Welsh Premier League Team of the Year. He signed with Stockport County in June 2017 and was named as the club's Player of the Season in 2017–18 after scoring 28 goals from 47 appearances. He returned to League football with Morecambe in June 2018.

Playing career

Crewe Alexandra
Born in Northwich, Oswell began his career at Crewe Alexandra. Alongside club-mate Ollie Turton, he joined Northern Premier League Division One South side Market Drayton Town on loan in February 2011, making his competitive debut in a 3–0 victory over Spalding United on 5 February. Having scored six goals for the "Gingerbread Men", he went on to end the 2010–11 season on loan in the Northern Premier League Premier Division with Nantwich Town, scoring three goals in eight appearances for the "Dabbers".

Oswell was handed a one-year professional contract at Gresty Road and sent out on loan to Welsh club Rhyl for the first half of the 2011–12 season. After a strong start during his spell at Belle Vue, scoring six goals in his first ten appearances, he was named as Cymru Alliance player of the month for October. He went on to score a total of 19 goals in 20 appearances for the "Lilywhites".

Inverness to Broughton
On 28 June 2012, Oswell joined Scottish Premier League side Inverness Caledonian Thistle, who were managed by former England international Terry Butcher. He made his "Caley Thistle" debut on 11 August, in a 1–1 draw with Kilmarnock at the Caledonian Stadium. He featured in just one further game before leaving the club by mutual consent in January 2013. He re-signed for former club Nantwich Town in February 2013, before moving to Witton Albion in March 2013. He helped Albion to qualify for the play-offs, though left Wincham Park before their play-off semi-final tie with F.C. United of Manchester.

Oswell signed for Australian National Premier Leagues NSW club APIA Leichhardt Tigers in May 2013, making his debut later that month against the Rockdale City Suns. He helped the Tigers to win the 2013 edition of the Waratah Cup, scoring a hat-trick against the Central Coast Mariners Academy in the quarter-finals, and then the opening goal in the 3–0 victory over Sutherland Sharks in the grand final at Seymour Shaw Park. He returned to Wales in September 2013 after rejoining Rhyl, who now were playing in the Welsh Premier League. He scored three goals in 15 appearances for Rhyl, before ending the 2013–14 campaign by playing six games for eventual runners-up Airbus UK Broughton.

Newtown
Oswell signed with Newtown in June 2014. He finished as the club's top scorer in the 2014–15 season after scoring 20 goals in 37 appearances, and was named on the Welsh Premier League Team of the Year. The "Robins" finished sixth in the league, but made it to the next season's UEFA Europa League qualification stage after beating Aberystwyth Town 2–1 in the Europa League play-off final at Park Avenue. They also reached the final of the Welsh Cup, but were beaten 2–0 by The New Saints. He scored 13 goals in 34 games across the 2015–16 campaign, including a hat-trick in a 3–2 win over Connah's Quay Nomads on 16 April. His tally also included two goals against Maltese side Valletta in what was the club's first ever victory in the Europa League. However Newtown failed to qualify for Europe for the next season after losing 2–1 to Airbus UK Broughton in the play-off semi-finals at Latham Park. He scored 25 goals in 37 appearances during the 2016–17 season, earning himself the Welsh Premier League golden boot and a place on the Welsh Premier League Team of the Year, as well as the overall Welsh Premier League Player of the Season award. However Newtown could only manage a seventh-place finish, and were beaten 3–2 by Bangor City in the Europa League play-off semi-final at Nantporth. Oswell scored three hat-tricks during the season, against Rhyl, Aberystwyth Town and Airbus UK Broughton.

Stockport County
Oswell signed for Stockport County in June 2017. Manager Jim Gannon said he thought goalscoring centre-forwards were hard to find in non-league football so had instead looked at the Welsh league in order to find a front-man to lead the "Hatters". It proved to be an astute signing, as Oswell scored 28 goals in 47 games, including hat-tricks against Leamington, North Ferriby United and Spennymoor Town. County qualified for the National League North play-offs with a fifth-place finish, but were beaten 1–0 by Chorley at Edgeley Park at the semi-final stage. Oswell was named as the club's Player of the Season.

Morecambe
He returned to League football with Morecambe in June 2018.

Wrexham
In January 2019 he was bought by Wrexham for an undisclosed fee, signing an 18-month contract.

Telford
In July 2020, Oswell signed for A.F.C. Telford United.

Style of play
Oswell is a powerful striker with good aerial ability and hold-up play.

Personal life
Whilst playing semi-professionally, Oswell worked as a physiotherapy assistant within the National Health Service and studied physiotherapy at university. As part of his final placement for university, Oswell travelled to Uganda with a charity group to help children with neurological conditions. He graduated from the University of Salford in July 2017.

Career statistics

Honours
APIA Leichhardt Tigers
Waratah Cup winner: 2013

Airbus UK Broughton
Welsh Premier League runner-up: 2013–14

Newtown
Welsh Cup runner-up: 2015

Individual
Welsh Premier League Player of the Season: 2016–17
Welsh Premier League Team of the Year: 2014–15, 2016–17
Stockport County F.C. Player of the Season: 2017–18

References

1992 births
Living people
Sportspeople from Northwich
English footballers
Association football forwards
Crewe Alexandra F.C. players
Market Drayton Town F.C. players
Nantwich Town F.C. players
Rhyl F.C. players
Inverness Caledonian Thistle F.C. players
Witton Albion F.C. players
APIA Leichhardt FC players
Airbus UK Broughton F.C. players
Newtown A.F.C. players
Stockport County F.C. players
Morecambe F.C. players
Wrexham A.F.C. players
Northern Premier League players
Cymru Premier players
Scottish Premier League players
National Premier Leagues players
National League (English football) players
English Football League players
English expatriate footballers
English expatriate sportspeople in Australia
Expatriate soccer players in Australia
Alumni of the University of Salford
British physiotherapists
AFC Telford United players